Abraham Wolf Binder (January 13, 1895 – October 10, 1966 in New York City) was an American composer.

Binder was born in New York City on the Lower East Side. He studied at Columbia University. His father was a synagogue worship leader who learned the music of the services from his father who was a cantor in Galicia. In 1900, at the age of four, he joined his father's synagogue choir. From age seven to fourteen, he joined the professional choir of Cantor Abraham Frachtenberg as an alto soloist. Frachtenberg's choral compositions deeply influenced Binder. At the age of fourteen, he became the choir director of the Kamenitzer Schul in downtown Manhattan under Cantor Abraham Singer. In 1911, he became the organist and choir director of Temple Beth El in Greenpoint, Brooklyn. In 1913 he moved on to the same role at Temple Adath Israel in the Bronx. In 1916 he formed a choral union for Hadassah, then a new organization, where he arranged many Zionist songs in modern harmonizations for a yearly series of well-received concerts of his choral arrangements. His own musical compositions thereafter reflected the Zionist desire to return to Palestine. In 1917 he was invited to found the music department for the 92nd Street Y, where he established a choral society and symphonic workshop and composed works for a children's opera program. At the same time he became the music director of Temple Emanuel of New York's religious school where he began to compose and arrange Reform liturgical music that would be incorporated into the Reform Hymnals which he was appointed to edit. In 1921 Rabbi Wise met Binder after a performance at the 92Y and invited him to become an instructor of Jewish Music at the New York Jewish Institute of Religion. The next year Rabbi Wise invited him to become choirmaster of the Free Synagogue. In 1937 he was appointed Professor of Jewish Liturgical Music at the JIR. He was the founding music director of the Stephen Wise Free Synagogue from 1922 under Rabbi Stephen S. Wise until his death in 1966. He was a respected leader within the Union of American Hebrew Congregations, having edited and published many compositions and articles on synagogue music. He composed an opera, several orchestral suites and works of choir music. He also collected and arranged Jewish folk songs.

Selected works
A tfile
Adon olam
Adoration
Etz hayyim hi
Kindling the Sabbath Lights
O Bless the Lord, My Soul
Seder avoda
Two Hassidic Moods, for string quartet

References

External links 
 Biography
 Stephen Wise Free Synagogue's official site
 

1895 births
1966 deaths
Musicians from New York City
American male composers
20th-century American composers
Jewish composers
American Jews
Columbia University alumni
20th-century American male musicians